Several vessels have been named Lapwing, after the northern lapwing, a species of bird:

 traded between London and Africa for the St George's Bay Company. Later she became a packet and coaster.
 was launched at Bristol and lengthened in 1797. She was a West Indiaman until in 1801 she became a slave ship. However, on her first slave trading voyage a Spanish privateer captured her. Although the Spanish authorities ordered her restitution to her owners, it is not clear that the order was anything but moot.
On 26 September 1941 she was straggling from Convoy HG 73 when  torpedoed and sank her in the Atlantic Ocean north north west of the Azores; 24 of her 34 crew were lost.

See also
 – any one of eight vessels of the British Royal Navy
 – any one of three packets that served the British East India Company

References 

Ship names